JS Shōryū (SS-510) is the tenth boat of Sōryū-class submarines. She was commissioned on 18 March 2019.

Construction and career
Shōryū was laid down at Kawasaki Heavy Industries Kobe Shipyard on January 28, 2015, as the 2014 plan 2900-ton submarine No. 8125 based on the medium-term defense capability development plan. At the launching ceremony, it was named Shōryū and launched on 6 November 2017. She's commissioned on 18 March 2019 and deployed to Kure.

Shōryū homeport is Kure.

On October 9, 2020, anti-submarine warfare training was conducted with the escort vessels JS Kaga and JS Ikazuchi which were participating in the Reiwa 2nd Indo-Pacific dispatch training in the South China Sea.

Gallery

Citations

External links

2017 ships
Sōryū-class submarines
Ships built by Kawasaki Heavy Industries